Rubén Companioni Blanco (born 18 May 1990) is a Cuban former professional cyclist, who rode professionally in 2013 and from 2016 to 2018.

Major results
2010
 10th Overall Vuelta a Cuba
2011
 1st Stage 3 Vuelta a Costa Rica
2016
 1st Stage 1 Redlands Bicycle Classic 
 2nd stage 2  Tour of Utah
2017
 5th Overall Tour de Beauce
2018 
 1st Overall Joe Martin Stage Race
1st Stage 1

References

External links

1990 births
Living people
Cuban male cyclists
21st-century Cuban people